Operation Sea Orbit was the 1964 around-the-world cruise of the United States Navy's Task Force One, consisting of USS Enterprise (CVAN-65), USS Long Beach (CGN-9), and USS Bainbridge (DLGN-25). This all-nuclear-powered unit steamed 30,565 miles unrefuelled around the world for sixty-five days.

Concept
Operation Sea Orbit was the idea of Vice Admiral John S. McCain, Jr., who saw the exercise – which demonstrated how nuclear-powered ships could operate unfettered by shore logistical ties – as a statement of American technical achievement similar to that of the coal-burning Great White Fleet in 1907–1909.

Deployment
Long Beach and Bainbridge departed Norfolk on 28 April 1964, in company with the aircraft carrier  for the Atlantic crossing to the Mediterranean, where the rendezvous with Enterprise was scheduled. Task Force 1 formed up at Bahia de Pollença, Mallorca on 13 May, before undertaking a series of exercises to test the efficiency of the all-nuclear formation working together.

Having been relieved by other vessels, TF1 departed on its trans-global cruise on 31 July 1964, with all three ships having taken aboard maximum provisions the day before to ensure there was no need for further underway replenishment en route. The task force initially sailed down the west coast of Africa, calling at Rabat, Dakar; Freetown, Monrovia and Abidjan, before crossing the equator. By 10 August, TF1 had reached the Cape of Good Hope, where it conducted exercises with a pair of South African Navy ships.

Following the South African visit, TF1 transited the Mozambique Channel into the Indian Ocean where the ships then called at Mombasa, before transiting the Indian Ocean to Pakistan, where they rendezvoused with three ships of the Pakistan Navy, before the entire force called at Karachi. However, due to the sea conditions it was determined to be too dangerous for either Enterprise or Long Beach to enter the port; instead, while Bainbridge came alongside, the two larger ships were forced to anchor several miles outside the harbour.

Upon departing from Karachi, TF1 transited along the west coast of India before turning towards Australia.

TF1 crossed the South Pacific Ocean and rounded Cape Horn back into the Atlantic, with visits to Buenos Aires and Montevideo before the entire task force put in at Rio de Janeiro. Having departed Brazil, Bainbridge was detached on 30 September to return to Charleston, while Enterprise and Long Beach put in at Norfolk, all three arriving back on 3 October 1964.

Task Force One had spent 65 days deployed, with 57 of them at sea, and steamed 30,216 miles in total without replenishment. Rear Admiral Strean noted that the flexibility of operating a force of nuclear powered vessels meant that TF1 "could have been diverted to any other maritime area of the world without logistical considerations and could have been ready for immediate operations upon arrival".

Command
Commander, Task Force One: Rear Admiral Bernard M. Strean (Commander Carrier Division 2) 
: Captain Frederick H. Michaelis
Carrier Air Wing Six: Commander T.L. Nielsen
: Captain Frank H. Price, Jr.
: Captain Hal C. Castle

Commemorations
Veterans of Operation Sea Orbit gathered on July 30, 2004, for a 40th anniversary reunion. In 2011, Operation Sea Orbit was included in the Technology for the Nuclear Age: Nuclear Propulsion display for the Cold War exhibit at the U.S. Navy Museum in Washington, DC.

See also
 Operation Sandblast
 Great White Fleet
 Nuclear powered cruisers of the United States Navy
 1966 Soviet submarine global circumnavigation

Notes

References

 

United States Navy in the 20th century
Circumnavigations
Non-combat military operations involving the United States
Operation Sea Orbit
Operation Sea Orbit